Manfred S. Gorvy (born 4 May 1938) is a South African billionaire investor and philanthropist based in London. He is the founder and chairman of Hanover Acceptances.

Early life
Manfred S. Gorvy was born on 4 May 1938 in South Africa. He attended Parktown Boys' High School and later received a Bachelor of Commerce from the University of the Witwatersrand in Johannesburg.

Career
He founded Hanover Acceptances, a property, agribusiness and financial investment company, in 1974, and serves as chairman. The firm includes four subsidiaries: Dorrington; Refresco Gerber; African Realty Trust; Fresh Capital. The Blackstone Group tried to acquire Refresco Gerber in 2014; the offer was rejected by Gorvy.

He is a Fellow of the South African Institute of Chartered Accountants.

In 2008, Gorvy was the 312th richest person in the United Kingdom, with an estimated wealth of £260 million, according to the Sunday Times Rich List. Ten years later, he appeared on the Sunday Times Rich List 2018 as the 163rd richest person in the United Kingdom, with a reported fortune of £873 million.

Personal life
He is married to Lydia R. Gorvy, who has served on the Board of Directors of Hanover Acceptances since 1991. He has four children: Sean Gorvy, Brett Gorvy, Dylan Gorvy and Bronwen Noik. Their eldest son Sean Gorvy is Chief Executive of Hanover Acceptances Limited; their son Brett Gorvy is based in New York and is part owner of international contemporary art gallery Levy Gorvy; their son Dylan Gorvy is an equine surgeon and part owner of an equine hospital in Sweden, Malaren Hastklinik. Their daughter Bronwen is Montessori teacher by training and lives in London.

Philanthropy
In 2011, the Gorvys endowed the refurbishment of a lecture theatre at the Victoria and Albert Museum in London, which was then renamed The Lydia and Manfred Gorvy Lecture Theatre. The couple have also made substantial donations to the Royal National Theatre, the Tate, the Royal Shakespeare Company, and the Donmar Warehouse.

References

Living people
People from Johannesburg
Businesspeople from London
University of the Witwatersrand alumni
South African billionaires
South African investors
South African philanthropists
People associated with the Victoria and Albert Museum
1938 births
Alumni of Parktown Boys' High School